Aram Sargsyan may refer to:

Aram Sargsyan (born 1961), Armenian Prime Minister
Aram Gaspar Sargsyan (born 1949), Armenian politician, the last secretary of the ASSR Communist Party of Armenia and the founder of the Armenian Democratic Party
Aram Sargsyan (singer) (born 1984), Armenian pop singer, songwriter, comedia, better known as Aram Mp3